The 1945 Dartmouth Indians football team represented Dartmouth College during the 1945 college football season.

Schedule

References

Dartmouth
Dartmouth Big Green football seasons
Dartmouth Indians football